Papian, also transliterated as Papyan, is an Armenian surname. Notable people with the surname include:

Ara Papian (born 1961), Armenian lawyer, historian and diplomat
Hasmik Papian (born 1961), Armenian soprano
Lernik Papyan (born 1966), Soviet and Armenian boxer
Ruben Papian (born 1962), para-scientist specializing in metaphysics and parapsychology

Armenian-language surnames